'Aïn Taïba (or Hassi Taïba) is an oasis and pit cave in Algeria.

Location

History

Aïn Taïba was known to nineteenth-century explorers as the only water point in the Issaouane Erg (Grande Erg Orientale) dune massif.
It was therefore a necessary stopping place. 
Among others the oasis was visited by Fernand Foureau, Ismaël Bou Derba, Paul Flatters and Gaston Méry.

Notes

Sources

Further reading

Oases of Algeria
Caves of Algeria